Tawny Moyer (born March 30, 1957) is a former American actress. She is best known for her role as nurse Jill Franco in the horror film Halloween II (1981).

Moyer also appeared in films such as California Suite (1978), Looker (1981), A Fine Mess (1986), and Thank Heaven (2001). She has made guest appearances on television shows, including Barnaby Jones, Hunter, The A-Team, Knight Rider, The Nanny, and The Drew Carey Show.

Filmography

Film

Television

References

External links 
 

1957 births
20th-century American actresses
21st-century American actresses
Actresses from San Diego
American film actresses
American television actresses
Living people